Pierre II de Montferrand, lord of Landiras, was a French knight who served the English during the Hundred Years' War. He was the Governor of Blaye and was executed in July 1454.

Biography
Pierre was a son of Bertrand III de Montferrand and Isabelle de Preissac, dame of Landiras. He married Mary, illegitimate daughter of the John of Lancaster, Duke of Bedford. Mary was a granddaughter of Henry IV of England. After being executed in 1454, he was succeeded by his son François.

References
 Bailey, Donald A.  Les Châteaux de Landiras et de Montferrand and their Seigneurial Families - Part One: Setting, Medieval History, and Genealogy, Advances in Historical Studies, June 2013. p. 89.

Year of birth unknown
1454 deaths
15th-century French people